Christiane Sadlo (born 25 January 1954) is a German screenwriter, dramaturge, and journalist. She is best known by her pseudonym Inga Lindström. She was married to sculptor Karl Halt Trossbach until his death in 2018. The couple had a daughter.

Works

TV films and series 
Schloss Hohenstein, 13 episodes, ARD 1991–94
Der Bergdoktor, 12 episodes and two 90 min specials, Sat.1 1991–94
Forsthaus Falkenau, 5. season, 2 episodes, ZDF 1994
Wo das Herz zu Hause ist, Sat.1 1993
Die Unzertrennlichen, TV series, TV pilot, 13 episodes, Sat.1 1996/97
Die Geliebte, TV series, episode Das Abschiedsgeschenk, ZDF, April 1998
Hurenmord – ein Pfarrer schweigt, Co-Author with Herrmann Kirchmann, Krimi, Sat.1 September 1998
Lisa Falk, TV series, episode Tod des Professors, ZDF, September 1998
Sommergewitter, ZDF, December 1998
Wie stark muss eine Liebe sein, ZDF, December 1998
Ich bin kein Mörder, ZDF 1999
Die weißen Vögel, ZDF 1999
Das Geheimnis des Rosengartens, ARD 1999
Das Herz des Priesters (two parts), ZDF 1999
Am Ende siegt die Liebe, ARD 1999
Herzstolpern, 2001
Rosamunde Pilcher: Wind über dem Fluss (Screenplay), 2001
Das Geheimnis der Mittsommernacht, 2001
Liebe unter weißen Segeln, 2001
Zugvögel der Liebe, 2001
Rosamunde Pilcher: Küste der Träume (Screenplay), 2001
Die Braut meines Freundes, 2001
Ein Geschenk der Liebe, 2001
Stimme des Herzens, 2000
Am Ende siegt die Liebe, 2000
Das Herz des Priesters, 2000
Der Zauber des Rosengartens, 2000
Rosamunde Pilcher: Ruf der Vergangenheit (Screenplay), 2000
Liebe, Lügen, Leidenschaft, 2002
Die Zeit mit dir, 2002
Rosamunde Pilcher: Mit den Augen der Liebe, 2002
Rosamunde Pilcher: Flamme der Liebe, Screenplay, 2003
Rosamunde Pilcher: Federn im Wind, Screenplay, 2004
Die Kinder meiner Braut, 2004
Utta Danella: Das Familiengeheimnis (Screenplay), 2004
Familie Dr. Kleist, TV series, since 2004
Rosamunde Pilcher: Vermächtnis der Liebe (Screenplay), 2005
Brief eines Unbekannten, 2005
Eine Liebe am Gardasee, 2006
Hilfe, meine Tochter heiratet, 2006
Die Gipfelstürmerin, 2007
Wiedersehen in Verona, 2007
Barbara Wood: Karibisches Geheimnis (Screenplay), 2009
Sisi – Italien (Screenplay), 2009
Wilde Wellen, TV miniseries 2011

References

1954 births
Living people
People from Ravensburg
German women journalists
German women screenwriters
German screenwriters
German television writers
Mass media people from Baden-Württemberg